Transport in Tianjin consists of an extensive network of roads and railways and a major airport.  Bicycle is a major means of transport in daily use of the city.

Rail
There are several railway stations in the city, Tianjin railway station being the principal one. It was built in 1888, initially, the station was located at Wangdaozhuang. The station was later moved to Laolongtou on the banks of the Hai He River in 1892, so the station was renamed Laolongtou Railway Station. The station was rebuilt from scratch in 1988. The rebuilding work began on April 15, 1987 and was finished on October 1, 1988. The Tianjin Railway Station is also locally called the 'East Station', due to its geographical position.

Tianjin West railway station and Tianjin North railway station are also major railway stations in Tianjin. There is also Tanggu railway station is located in the important port area of Tanggu District, and TEDA railway station located in TEDA, to the north of Tanggu. There are several other railway stations in the city.

Construction on a Beijing-Tianjin high-speed rail began on July 4, 2005, and was scheduled to be completed in 2007.

The following rail lines go through Tianjin:

 Jinghu Railway, from Beijing to Shanghai
 Jingha Railway, from Beijing to Harbin
 Jingqin Railway, from Beijing to Qinhuangdao, Hebei
 Jinpu Railway, from Tianjin to Pukou District, Nanjing
 Jinji Railway, from Tianjin urban area to Ji County, Tianjin
 Jinba Railway, from Tianjin to Bazhou, Hebei

Roads and expressways
Some spots in Tianjin, including roads and bridges, have names from Dr. Sun Yat-Sen's Three Principles of the People (for example, Minquan Gate on Zhonghuan Road). Names harkening back to the era of the Republic of China on the mainland also appear (e.g. Beiyang Road). Many roads in Tianjin are named after a Chinese province or city. Also, Tianjin is unlike Beijing, in that very few roads run parallel to the major four compass directions.

Tianjin has three ring roads. Unlike Beijing, the Inner and Middle Ring Roads are not closed, traffic-controlled roadways and some often have traffic light intersections. The Outer Ring Road is the closest thing to a highway-level ring road, although traffic is often chaotic and sometimes more than chaotic.

 Inner Ring Road (neihuan)
 Middle Ring Road (zhonghuan)
 Outer Ring Road (waihuan)

Tianjin's roads often finish in dao (道 avenue), xian (S: 线 / T: 線 line, more used for highways and through routes) and lu (路 road). Jie (街 street) is rare. As Tianjin's roads are rarely in a cardinal compass direction, jing (S: 经 / T: 經) roads and wei (S: 纬 / T: 緯) roads often appear, which attempt to run more directly north-south and east-west, respectively.

The following seven expressways of China run in or through Tianjin:

 Jingjintang Expressway, from Beijing, through Tianjin's urban area, to Tanggu District / TEDA
 Jinghu Expressway, from Jinjing Gonglu Bridge to Shanghai (together with Jingjintang Expressway, this is the expressway from Beijing to Shanghai)
 Jingshen Expressway, through Baodi District on its way from Beijing to Shenyang
 Tangjin Expressway, from Tanggu District, Tianjin, to Tangshan, Hebei -- known in Tianjin as the Jintang Expressway
 Baojin Expressway, from Beichen District, Tianjin, to Baoding, Hebei -- known in Tianjin as the Jinbao Expressway
 Jinbin Expressway, from Zhangguizhuang Bridge to Hujiayuan Bridge, both within Tianjin
 Jinji Expressway, from central Tianjin to Jixian County

The following six China National Highways pass through Tianjin:

 China National Highway 102, through Ji County, Tianjin on its way from Beijing to Harbin
 China National Highway 103, from Beijing, through Tianjin's urban area, to Tanggu District
 China National Highway 104, from Beijing, through Tianjin Municipality, to Fuzhou
 China National Highway 105, from Beijing, through Tianjin Municipality, to Macau
 China National Highway 112, circular highway around Beijing, passes through Tianjin Municipality
 China National Highway 205, from Shanhaiguan, Hebei, through Tianjin Municipality, to Guangzhou

Air
Tianjin Binhai International Airport (ZBTJ) is located to the east of the urban area, in Dongli District, Tianjin.

Public transport
Trams in Tianjin network was built by Belgian interests. The concession was given by the occupying powers in 1901 and recognized by the Chinese authorities in 1904. Tram services began in 1906. Tianjin was the first city to have its own citywide tram system in China. Buses were introduced by the municipality in 1932. Tramways were withdrawn around 1972. Trams returned in Tianjin as TEDA Modern Guided Rail Tram. There were 402 bus lines in the city as of 2004.

The Tianjin Metro is currently operational, consisting of 6 subway lines and 1 tram system. The initial line started construction on July 4, 1970 and commenced service in 1984. However, this line, with its outdated trains and services, was forced to close down in 2001, and renovation commenced until 2006, when the line (now known as Line 1 on the system) reopened. The other line, Line 9, started construction in 2001 and opened in 2004, with recent extensions in 2011. The Tram line, TEDA Modern Guided Rail Tram, commenced operations in 2007 and runs between downtown Tianjin and TEDA (Tianjin Economic Development Area) in the coastal region. Other lines are under construction and will be successively opened.

See also
TEDA Modern Guided Rail Tram